James Joseph Ring (February 15, 1895 – July 6, 1965) was a starting pitcher in Major League Baseball who played for the Cincinnati Reds (1917–1920), Philadelphia Phillies (1921–1925, 1928), New York Giants (1926) and St. Louis Cardinals (1927). Ring batted and threw right-handed.

Ring was used sparingly by the Cincinnati Reds from 1917 to 1918. He won 10 games in 1919, and beat Ed Cicotte and the Chicago White Sox in Game Four of the World Series on a three-hit, 2–0 shutout. He pitched again in Game Six, losing after allowing one run in five innings of relief. The next year he won 17 games, and was sent to the Philadelphia Phillies at the end of the season along with Greasy Neale in the same trade that brought Eppa Rixey to Cincinnati.

From 1921 to 1925 Ring averaged 12.8 wins per season, with a career-high 18 wins in 1923. Then, he was traded by the Phillies to the New York Giants before the 1927 season. After an 11–10 mark with the Giants, he was sent to the St. Louis Cardinals along with Frankie Frisch in exchange for Rogers Hornsby.

Ring failed to win a game for St. Louis in 1927. He appeared in 13 games and had a 0–4 record. In 1928, his last major league season, he returned to the Phillies and had a 4–17 mark in 35 appearances.

In a 12-season career, Ring posted a 118–149 record with 833 strikeouts and a 4.13 ERA in 2357.1 innings pitched.

Jimmy Ring died in Queens, New York, aged 70.

External links
Jimmy Ring - Baseballbiography.com
Baseball Reference
Retrosheet
The Deadball Era

1895 births
1965 deaths
Major League Baseball pitchers
Cincinnati Reds players
New York Giants (NL) players
Philadelphia Phillies players
St. Louis Cardinals players
Baseball players from New York (state)
Sportspeople from Brooklyn
Baseball players from New York City
Jersey City Skeeters players
Louisville Colonels (minor league) players
Buffalo Bisons (minor league) players
Chattanooga Lookouts players
Newark Bears (IL) players
Toledo Mud Hens players
Burials at St. John's Cemetery (Queens)
Lowell Grays players